The 2022 World Lacrosse Men's U-21 Championship was the ninth edition of the international junior men's field lacrosse tournament for national teams organized by the Federation of International Lacrosse (FIL) held at University of Limerick in Limerick, Ireland from August 10 to August 20. This competition was broadcast worldwide including United States, Canada, Europe, Latin America, Caribbean, Middle East, Africa, and Oceania. This competition also ran alongside with the Lacrosse World Festival which held from 16 to 19 August. The United States won the championship beating Canada 12–10 at the final.

Pool play

Group A

Group B 

 Note: Israel had a better record than Latvia so they advanced to the Championship Play-in.

Group C

Group D

Group E

Final standings 

Ref

Honours

All-world team 

 Most Valuable Player: CJ Kirst, United States
 Most Outstanding Attacker: Ross Scott, Canada
 Most Outstanding Midfielder: CJ Kirst, United States
 Most Outstanding Defender: Kenny Brower, United States
 Most Outstanding Goalkeeper: Liam Entenmann, United States
 Graham Bundy, Jr., M, United States
 Owen Hiltz, A, Canada
 Graydon Hogg, M, Canada
 Brennan O’Neill, A, United States
 Levi Verch, D, Canada
 Jake Piseno, D, Haudenosaunee

President's team 

The President's Team consists of the top 10 athletes outside of the Pool A teams, as selected by the awards panel

 Ronen Abramovich, Israel
 Joshua Balcarcel, Puerto Rico
 Dante Bowen, Jamaica
 Tin Chiu Lo, China
 Christian Della Rocco, Netherlands
 Aaron Eastwood, Wales
 Conor Foley, Ireland
 Damon Hsu, China
 Jonas Hunter, Sweden
 Shaun Ito, Japan

Ref

References

External links 
 Official website

 
Recurring sporting events established in 1988